Pasuckuakohowog is a Native American game similar to football.

The term literally translates to "they gather to play ball with the foot" and was described by Roger Williams.

There are records that show it was played in the 17th century. The game was played on beaches with goals about a half-mile-wide and set one mile apart. Up to 500 people usually played Pasuckuakohowog at one time, while many games had up to 1000 players.

Pasuckuakohowog was a dangerous game and was played almost like a war. Players would often have to quit due to broken bones or other serious injuries. Pasuckuakohowog players wore ornaments and war paint to disguise themselves from retaliation after the game. The game would often last for hours and sometimes carry over to the next day. After each match there would be a large celebratory feast, including both teams.

See also
Mesoamerican ballgame
Soccer in the United States

References

External links
 http://www.footballnetwork.org/dev/historyoffootball/earlierhistory_1.asp
 http://www.expertfootball.com/history/soccer_history_america.php
 http://national.soccerhall.org/history/origins.htm

Ball games
Native American sports and games